The North Island line is a proposal to provide rapid transit service for the area between the existing MTR Island line and the northern coast of Hong Kong Island in order to relieve the already congested Island line.

Originally, according to the document "Rail Projects Under Planning 2000" released by the Highways Department, the current Tung Chung line would be extended from Hong Kong terminus eastward and two new stations, Tamar station and Exhibition Centre station are proposed on the extension. The new route would then connect and continue on the Island line from Fortress Hill station to Chai Wan terminus. The Tseung Kwan O line will have newly constructed tunnels connected from its North Point terminus to Fortress Hill station and continue on the remaining western half of the Island line.

In 2013, the Highways Department released a second option for the North Island line scheme, also known as the "interchange scheme" because it will only extend the Tung Chung line and the Tseung Kwan O line to meet at Tamar station where it will act as an interchange station for the two lines without dividing the Island line. The original scheme is known as the "swap scheme" for distinction.

2000 proposal
The extension of the Tung Chung line formed part of the third phase of land reclamation in Victoria Harbour on Hong Kong Island's northern coast. Due to the disagreement from public and political groups such as Society for Protection of the Harbour as well the insufficient traffic demand, the MTR Corporation never gave the proposal a commencement date. 

Thee proposed Sha Tin to Central Link and the merger of MTRC and KCRC also influenced the fate of the North Island line. For these reasons, in 2003 Hong Kong Government postponed it indefinitely. However, the MTRC included the Sha Tin to Central Link and the North Island line details in the diagrams of the latest schemes of the West Island line and South Island line, released in 2008. Those diagrams have excluded the now cancelled Central South station and Racecourse Station in Happy Valley.

2013 proposal
On 21 February 2013, the Highways Department launched stage two of public consultation of Our Future Railway, and proposed two schemes for the North Island line. In addition to a "Swap" scheme which was similar to previous proposals, the consultation documents also included a second "Interchange" scheme.

"Swap" scheme
The existing Tung Chung line would be extended along the northern coast of Hong Kong Island, with Tamar, Exhibition Centre, Causeway Bay North and Fortress Hill stations along the route. The extension would then connect eastwards to the existing Island line at Fortress Hill station, and continue on the remaining Island line section to Chai Wan station.

Concurrently, the Tseung Kwan O line would extend from its current westbound terminus at North Point station to the existing Island line at Fortress Hill station, and continue on the remaining Island line to Kennedy Town station.

This scheme would greatly increase the number of stations reached directly by the Tung Chung line and the Tseung Kwan O line on Hong Kong Island, but east-west directional traffic along the existing Island line would be interrupted and require an interchange. In addition, the maximum train frequency between Fortress Hill and Chai Wan stations, which would be served by the Tung Chung line, would have to reduce by 8 trains per hour because the service frequency of the Tung Chung line is restricted by the capacity of the Tsing Ma Bridge. The signalling system and rolling stock used on both lines are also different, so the “swap” scheme was not considered in the plan.

"Interchange" scheme
Both the existing Tung Chung line and Tseung Kwan O line would be extended along the northern coast of Hong Kong Island. Three stations, namely Tamar, Exhibition Centre and Causeway Bay North, would be constructed along the extensions, and either Tamar or Causeway Bay North station would be chosen as an interchange between the two lines.

This scheme would preserve the existing Island line in its current form and would not change the current commuting pattern between the Central, Western and Eastern Districts. However, as the Tung Chung and Tseung Kwan O lines would not be run on the Island line, passengers would still need to interchange as they currently do. Also, this arrangement would be less effective than the "Swap" scheme in relieving congestion, since although the number of stations and the area served has increased, the link with the current Island line would still be the same, unlike the "Swap" scheme.

2014 plan
According to the "Railway Development Strategy 2014" document, the government opted for the interchange scheme because its construction cost and difficulties are lower and it does not interfere with the commuting patterns of current Island line users. Construction was expected to begin in 2021 and finish in 2026. The cost is estimated to be HK$20 billion in 2013 prices. As of 2021, construction has not begun though technical design proposals are under consideration.

References

Proposed railway lines in Hong Kong
1432 mm gauge railways in Hong Kong
Tung Chung line
Tseung Kwan O line